Kuhigan, also rendered as Kuhegan or Kuhikan, may refer to:
 Kuhigan-e Bala
 Kuhigan-e Pain